Al-Qaeda in the Arabian Peninsula ( or , Tanẓīm Qā‘idat al-Jihād fī Jazīrat al-‘Arab, "Organization of Jihad's Base in the Arabian Peninsula"), abbreviated as AQAP, also known as Ansar al-Sharia in Yemen (Jamā‘at Anṣār ash-Sharī‘ah, "Group of the Helpers of the Sharia"), is a militant Sunni Islamist terrorist group primarily active in Yemen and Saudi Arabia that is part of the al-Qaeda network. It is considered the most active of al-Qaeda's branches that emerged after the weakening of central leadership. The U.S. government believes AQAP to be the most dangerous al-Qaeda branch. The group established an emirate during the 2011 Yemeni Revolution, which waned in power after foreign interventions in the subsequent Yemeni Civil War.

The group has been designated a terrorist organization by the United Nations and several countries and international organizations.

Ideology and formation

Like al-Qaeda Central, AQAP opposes the monarchy of the House of Saud. AQAP was formed in January 2009 from a merger of al-Qaeda's Yemeni and Saudi branches. The Saudi group had been effectively suppressed by the Saudi government, forcing its members to seek sanctuary in Yemen. In 2010, it was believed to have several hundred members. The group also seeks for the destruction of the Israeli state and the liberation of the Palestinian territories.

Transformation into an active al-Qaeda affiliate

The number of terrorist plots in the West that originated from Pakistan declined considerably from most of them (at the outset), to 75% in 2007, and to 50% in 2010, as al-Qaeda shifted to Somalia and Yemen.

U.S. Secretary of State Hillary Clinton formally designated al-Qaeda in Yemen a terrorist organization on December 14, 2009. On August 24, 2010, The Washington Post journalist Greg Miller wrote that the CIA believed Yemen's branch of al-Qaeda had surpassed its parent organization, Osama bin Laden's core group, as al-Qaeda's most dangerous threat to the U.S. homeland.

On August 26, 2010, Yemen claimed that U.S. officials had exaggerated the size and danger of al-Qaeda in Yemen, insisting also that fighting the jihadist network's local branch remained Sanaa's job.  A former bodyguard of Osama bin Laden warned of an escalation in fighting between al-Qaeda and Yemeni authorities and predicted the government would need outside intervention to stay in power.

However, Ahmed al-Bahri told the Associated Press that attacks by al-Qaeda in southern Yemen was an indication of its increasing strength.

Operations and activities as al-Qaeda in the Arabian Peninsula 

Al-Qaeda was responsible for the USS Cole bombing in October 2000 in Aden, killing 17 U.S. sailors. In 2002, an al-Qaeda bomb damaged the French supertanker Limburg in the Gulf of Aden.

The Global Terrorism Database attributes the 2004 Khobar massacre to the group.

In addition to a number of attacks in Saudi Arabia, and the kidnap and murder of Paul Marshall Johnson Jr. in Riyadh in 2004, the group is suspected in connection with a bombing in Doha, Qatar, in March 2005. For a chronology of recent Islamist militant attacks in Saudi Arabia, see terrorism in Saudi Arabia.

Operations and activities as al-Qaeda in Yemen and Saudi Arabia

2009
In the 2009 Little Rock recruiting office shooting, Abdulhakim Mujahid Muhammad, formerly known as Carlos Leon Bledsoe, a Muslim convert who had spent time in Yemen, on June 1, 2009, opened fire with an SKS Rifle in a drive-by shooting on soldiers in front of a United States military recruiting office in Little Rock, Arkansas, in a jihad attack.  He killed Private William Long, and wounded Private Quinton Ezeagwula. He said that he was affiliated with and had been sent by al-Qaeda in the Arabian Peninsula.

AQAP said it was responsible for Umar Farouk Abdulmutallab's attempted Christmas Day bombing of Northwest Airlines Flight 253 as it approached Detroit on December 25, 2009.  In that incident, Abdulmutallab reportedly tried to set off plastic explosives sewn to his underwear, but failed to detonate them properly.

2010
On February 8, 2010, deputy leader Said Ali al-Shihri called for a regional holy war and blockade of the Red Sea to prevent shipments to Israel.  In an audiotape he called upon Somalia's al-Shabaab militant group for assistance in the blockade.

The 2010 cargo planes bomb plot was discovered on October 29, 2010, when two packages containing bombs found on cargo aircraft, based on intelligence received from government intelligence agencies, in the United Kingdom and the United Arab Emirates. The packages originated from Yemen, and were addressed to outdated addresses of two Jewish institutions in Chicago, Illinois, one of which was the Congregation Or Chadash, an LGBT synagogue. Al-Qaeda in the Arabian Peninsula took responsibility for the plot.  It posted its acceptance of responsibility on a number of radical Islamist websites monitored by the SITE Intelligence Group and the Nine Eleven Finding Answers Foundation, and wrote:

It also claimed responsibility for the crash of a UPS Boeing 747-400 cargo plane in Dubai on September 3. The statement continued:

American authorities had said they believed that al-Qaeda in the Arabian Peninsula was behind the plot.  Officials in the United Kingdom and the United States believe that it is most likely that the bombs were designed to destroy the planes carrying them.

In November 2010, the group announced a strategy, called "Operation Hemorrhage", which it said was designed to capitalize on the "security phobia that is sweeping America." The program would call for a large number of inexpensive, small-scale attacks against United States interests, with the intent of weakening the U.S. economy.

2012

On 21 May 2012, a soldier wearing a belt of explosives carried out a suicide attack on military personnel preparing for a parade rehearsal for Yemen's Unity Day. With over 120 people dead and 200 more injured, the attack was the deadliest in Yemeni history. AQAP claimed responsibility for the attack.

During the June 2012 al Qaeda retreat from its key southern Yemen stronghold, the organization planted land mines, which killed 73 civilians. According to the governor's office in Abyan province, 3,000 mines were removed from around Zinjibar and Jaar.

2013
On 5 December 2013, an attack on the Yemeni Defense Ministry in Sana'a involving a series of bomb and gun attacks killed at least 56 people. After footage of the attack was aired on Yemeni television, showing an attack on a hospital within the ministry compound and the killing of medical personnel and patients, the head of al Qaeda in the Arabian Peninsula released a video message apologizing. Qasim al-Raymi claimed that the team of attackers were directed not to assault the hospital in the attack, but that one had gone ahead and done so.

2014
On 9 May 2014, several soldiers from Yemen were killed after a skirmish sparked when a vehicle attacked a palace gate.

The group also publishes the online magazines Voice of Jihad and Inspire.

In New Zealand, it is listed as a terror group.

In December 2014, the group released a video depicting Luke Somers, a journalist whom they were holding hostage. On 26 November, U.S. Navy SEALs and Yemeni special forces attempted a hostage rescue where eight hostages, none American, were freed, but Luke Somers and four others had been moved to another location by AQAP prior to the raid. The nationalities of the eight hostages rescued were six Yemenis, one Saudi, and one Ethiopian. On 6 December, 40 SEALs used V-22 Ospreys to land a distance from the compound where Somers and Korkie were kept at about 1 a.m. local time, according to a senior defense official. An AQAP fighter apparently spotted them while relieving himself outside, a counter-terrorism official with knowledge of the operation told ABC News, beginning a firefight that lasted about 10 minutes. According to CBS News, dog barking could have alerted the hostage-takers of the operation. When the American soldiers finally entered the building where Somers and Korkie were kept, they found both men alive, but gravely wounded. Korkie and Somers died some minutes later despite attempts to save them.

2015

On 7 January 2015, Saïd Kouachi and Chérif Kouachi attacked French satirical newspaper Charlie Hebdo, resulting in 11 French citizens killed and another 11 injured. The French-born brothers of Algerian descent stated they were members of Al-Qaeda in Yemen, to an eyewitness. On 9 January, AQAP confirmed responsibility for the Charlie Hebdo shooting in a speech from top Shariah cleric Harith bin Ghazi al-Nadhari. The reason given was to gain "revenge for the honor" of the Islamic prophet Muhammad.

Capture of Mukalla

On 2 April 2015, AQAP fighters stormed the coastal city of Mukalla, capturing it on the 16th of April after the two-week Battle of Mukalla. They seized government buildings and used trucks to cart off more than $120 million from the central bank, according to the bank's director. AQAP forces soon passed control to a civilian council, giving it a budget of more than $4 million to provide services to residents of the city. AQAP maintained a police station in the city to mediate Sharia disputes but avoided imposing its rule across the city. AQAP refrained from using its name, instead of using the name the 'Sons of Hadhramaut' to emphasize its ties to the surrounding province.

Fall of Zinjibar and Jaar
On 2 December 2015, the provincial capital of Abyan Governorate, Zinjibar, and the town of Jaʿār were captured by AQAP fighters. Like Al Mukala, AQAP forces soon passed control to a civilian council, police patrols and other public services.

2016

Southern Abyan Offensive
On 20 February 2016, AQAP seized the southern Abyan governorate, linking them with their headquarters in Mukalla.

Liberation of Mukalla

On April 24, 2016, the United Arab Emirates Armed Forces entered Mukalla and commenced operations against AQAP, liberating Mukalla in 36 hours. The operation was hailed by US Defence Secretary James Mattis as a model of fighting terrorism.

Mukalla was then used as a base of operations by the UAE Armed Forces and Joint Special Operations Command, allowing the CIA to target AQAP strongest cells in Yemen.

2018
In August 2018, Al Jazeera reported that the Saudi Arabian-led coalition "battling Houthi rebels secured secret deals with al-Qaeda in Yemen and recruited hundreds of the group's fighters. ... Key figures in the deal-making said the United States was aware of the arrangements and held off on drone attacks against the armed group, which was created by Osama bin Laden in 1988."

According to the Associated Press, the Saudi-led coalition "cut secret deals with al-Qaida fighters, paying some to leave key cities and towns and letting others retreat with weapons, equipment and wads of looted cash... hundreds more were recruited to join the coalition itself."

2019
On 7 April 2019, UAE and Security Belt forces launched a large anti-terror military campaign to clear a number of mountains and valleys located in the Mahfad town, then a key hideout of AQAP militants. UAE-backed Yemeni security forces succeeded in seizing arms and ammunition, including hand grenades, improvised explosive devices and communication equipment and AQAP militants fled to other areas.

On 30 August 2019, UAE airstrikes on AQAP in southern Yemen targeted a number of moving vehicles carrying AQAP members.

In September 2019, AQAP took advantage and deployed across Abyan and Shabwa in southern Yemen following the UAE draw down from Yemen and increased infighting between Houthis and Hadi forces. According to a local Yemeni official, the absence of the Shabwani elite security units, that had been trained and equipped by the UAE, enabled AQAP to gain a foothold in the turbulent Shabwa province again.

2020
On January 31, 2020, The New York Times reported three U.S. officials "expressed confidence" that Qasim al-Raymi, the emir of AQAP, was killed in Yemen. For years al-Raymi eluded U.S. forces as he led what experts sometimes refer to as al-Qaida's “most dangerous franchise.” The former Deputy Assistant Secretary of Defense Mick Mulroy said, if confirmed, his death would be “very significant”. This was not the first time the United States has tried to get al-Raymi. He was the target of a January 29, 2017, special operations raid in which Navy SEAL William Owens (Navy SEAL) was killed. “The United States never forgets”, Mulroy said. The Wall Street Journal also reported his death and that al-Raymi directed multiple operations to attack the U.S. including the attempt to blow up a U.S.-bound airliner on Christmas Day 2009. His death was later confirmed by the White House on February 6.

2021

2022
In August 2022, the once-vaunted Al Qaeda in Arabian Peninsula is shown to be greatly weakened when none of the group's leaders were deemed potential successors to Ayman al-Zawahiri as leader of Al Qaeda following al-Zawahiri's death.

Ansar al-Sharia

In the wake of the 2011 Yemeni Revolution and the Battle of Zinjibar, an Islamist insurgent organization called Ansar al-Sharia (Yemen) (Supporters of Islamic Law), emerged in Yemen and seized control of areas in the Abyan Governorate and surrounding governorates in southern Yemen and declared them an Islamist Al-Qaeda Emirate in Yemen. There was heavy fighting with the Yemeni security forces over the control of these territories, with Ansar al-Sharia driven out of most of their territory over 2012.

In April 2011, Shaykh Abu Zubayr Adil bin Abdullah al-Abab, AQAP's chief religious figure, explained the name change as a re-branding exercise: "the name Ansar al-Sharia is what we use to introduce ourselves in areas where we work to tell people about our work and goals."

On 4 October 2012, the United Nations 1267–1989 Al-Qaida Sanctions Committee and the United States Department of State designated Ansar al-Sharia an alias for AQAP, with the State Department describing it as an attempt to attract followers in areas of Yemen where AQAP had been able to establish territorial control and implement its interpretation of Sharia.

U.S. drone strikes

A CIA targeted killing drone strike killed Kamal Derwish, an American citizen, and a group of al-Qaida operatives (including Qaed Salim Sinan al-Harethi) in Yemen in November 2002. Drones became shorthand in Yemen for a weak government allowing foreign forces to have their way.

On September 30, 2011, a US drone attack in Yemen resulted in the death of Anwar al-Awlaki, one of the group's leaders, and Samir Khan, the editor of Inspire, its English-language magazine. Both were US citizens.

The pace of US drone attacks quickened significantly in 2012, with over 20 strikes in the first five months of the year, compared to 10 strikes during the course of 2011.

Over the period 19–21 April 2014, a series of drone attacks on AQAP killed dozens of militants, and at least 3 civilians. A spokesperson for the Yemeni Supreme Security Committee described the attacks, which included elements of the Yemeni army as well as US drones, as "massive and unprecedented". The attacks were alleged to have targeted AQAP leadership, with a major AQAP base in Wadi al-Khayala reported to have been destroyed.

From March 1 through March 8, 2017, the US conducted 45 airstrikes against AQAP, a record amount of airstrikes conducted against the group by the US in recent history. The airstrikes were reported to have killed hundreds of AQAP militants. The US continued its airstrikes afterward. Around 1–2 April 2017, the US carried out another 20 airstrikes, increasing the total number of airstrikes against AQAP in 2017 to 75, nearly double previously yearly record of 41 airstrikes in 2009.

On August 31, 2019, at least 40 al Qaeda operatives were killed in airstrike carried out by the United States on a training camp in presence of the leaders of Hurras al-Deen, Ansar al-Tawhid and other allied groups in Syria.

Senior leaders

Members

The group has taken advantage of Yemen's "slow collapse into near-anarchy. Widespread corruption, growing poverty and internal fragmentation have helped make Yemen a breeding ground for terror." More than two years later, on April 25, 2012, a suspected US drone strike killed Mohammed Said al-Umdah, a senior AQAP member cited as the number four in the organization and one of the 2006 escapees. He had been convicted of the 2002 tanker bombing and for providing logistical and material support.

Yemeni analyst, Barak Barfi, discounted claims that marriage between the militant group and Yemeni tribes is a widespread practice, though he states that the bulk of AQAP members hail from the tribes.

AQAP is a popular choice for radicalized Americans seeking to join Islamist terror organizations overseas. In 2013 alone, at least three American citizens or permanent residents — Marcos Alonso Zea, Justin Kaliebe, and Shelton Thomas Bell — have attempted to join AQAP. They count among over 50 Americans who have attempted to join terrorist groups overseas, including AQAP, since 2007.

Reportedly, as many as 20 Islamist British nationals traveled to Yemen in 2009 to be trained by AQAP.
In February 2012, up to 500 Internationalistas from Somalia's Al Shabaab, after getting cornered by a Kenyan offensive and conflict with  Al Shabaab national legions, fled to Yemen. It is likely that a number of this group merged with AQAP.
The following is a list of people who have been purported to be AQAP members. Most, but not all, are or were Saudi nationals. Roughly half have appeared on Saudi "most wanted" lists. In the left column is the rank of each member in the original 2003 list of the 26 most wanted.

See also
Barry Walter Bujol

References

Bibliography

Johnsen, Gregory (2012). The Last Refuge: Yemen, al-Qaeda, and America's War in Arabia, Scribe, Melbourne. .

Further reading

 Peter Knoope, "AQAP: A Local Problem, A Global Concern" (International Centre for Counter-Terrorism - The Hague, 2013)

External links

Al-Qaeda in the Arabian Peninsula , Council on Foreign Relations
Al-Qaeda in the Arabian Peninsula (AQAP), Counter Extremism Project
AQAP in Yemen, Center for Strategic and International Studies (CSIS)
Al-Qa‘ida in the Arabian Peninsula (AQAP), U.S. National Counterterrorism Center

"Al-Qaeda" in Yemen: Timeline of Strikes and Statements, Jane Novak, Armies of Liberation, September 21, 2008
Profile: Al-Qaeda in the Arabian Peninsula, BBC News, 31 October 2010
Factbox: AQAP, Al Qaeda's Yemen-based wing, Reuters, 22 March 2011

 
Anti-communist organizations
Terrorism in Yemen
Organisations designated as terrorist by the United Kingdom
Organizations designated as terrorist by the United States
Organizations based in Asia designated as terrorist
Rebel groups in Yemen
Jihadist groups
Organisations designated as terrorist by Australia
Yemeni Crisis (2011–present)
Organizations designated as terrorist by Canada
Organizations designated as terrorist by Bahrain
Organizations designated as terrorist by Malaysia
Organizations designated as terrorist by Saudi Arabia